San Chaopho Suea (Sao Chingcha) or San Chaopho Suea Phra Nakhon, usually shortened to San Chaopho Suea (commonly known in English as Tiger God Shrine) is a Chinese joss house located at 468 Tanao Road, San Chaopho Suea Sub-district, Phra Nakhon District in the old town Bangkok (Rattanakosin Island) near Sao Chingcha (Giant Swing) and Wat Mahannapharam with features the Southern Chinese architectural style. It is the shrine of Chaopho Suea (เจ้าพ่อเสือ; lit: Tiger God), according to the ancient Chinese belief and it is one of the most respected Chinese shrines in Bangkok and Thailand alike Wat Mangkon Kamalawat in Chinatown, especially during the Chinese New Year.

This shrine was built in 1834 in the reign of King Nang Klao (Rama III). In the past, it was located on Bamrung Mueang Road but was relocated by the command of King Chulalongkorn (Rama V) to the Tanao Road, the present location. The shrine enshrined statues of Chinese Supreme Being, including the Tiger God (Xuan Tian Shang Di), Lord Guan (God of Honesty), Caishen (God of Fortune), Dai Seng Ya (Monkey God) and Mazu (Goddess of the Sea), which are highly venerated among both Thai and Chinese people.

At present, it has been promoted as one of the nine temples under the project "Respect to the Nine Temples" (ไหว้พระ 9 วัด) of Tourism Authority of Thailand (TAT) along with other temples viz (Phra Nakhon side): Wat Phra Kaew, Wat Pho, Wat Chana Songkhram, Wat Suthat, City Pillar Shrine (Thonburi side): Wat Arun, Wat Rakhangkhositraram and Wat Kalayanamitr. It is now a recognised ancient monument of Bangkok since 1988.

See more
other Chinese temples in Bangkok

Wat Mangkon Kamalawat
Leng Buai Ia Shrine
Wat San Chao Chet
Chao Mae Thapthim Shrine
Poh Teck Tung Foundation
Thian Fah Foundation
Kian Un Keng Shrine
Wat Dibayavari Vihara

References 

Buildings and structures in Bangkok
Religious buildings and structures completed in 1834
1834 establishments in Siam
Religious buildings and structures in Bangkok
Phra Nakhon district
Registered ancient monuments in Bangkok
Chinese shrines in Thailand